Moo3 may refer to:
 Master of Orion III, a computer game
 Molybdenum(VI) oxide, a chemical compound